Valentin Sergeyevich Smirnov (born 13 February 1986) is a Russian middle distance runner.

International competitions

References

 

1986 births
Living people
Russian male middle-distance runners
Universiade gold medalists in athletics (track and field)
Universiade gold medalists for Russia
Universiade bronze medalists for Russia
Medalists at the 2011 Summer Universiade
Medalists at the 2013 Summer Universiade
Russian Athletics Championships winners